Besleria miniata is a species of plant in the family Gesneriaceae. It is endemic to Ecuador.  Its natural habitat is subtropical or tropical moist lowland forests.

References

Endemic flora of Ecuador
miniata
Data deficient plants
Taxonomy articles created by Polbot